Mount Stent is  mountain at the southern extreme of the Wallabies Nunataks, west of the Churchill Mountains. 

It was named in honor of N. E. Stent, a member of the 1961 Cape Hallett winter-over team, working as a technician on the geomagnetic project.

References 

Mountains of Oates Land